The 23rd Assembly District of Wisconsin is one of 99 districts in the Wisconsin State Assembly. Located in southeastern Wisconsin, the district comprises part of northeast Milwaukee County and southeast Ozaukee County.  It includes the villages of Whitefish Bay, Fox Point, and Bayside in Milwaukee County, as well as Grafton, Thiensville, and part of Mequon in Ozaukee County.  The district is represented by Democrat Deb Andraca, since January 2021.

The 23rd Assembly district is located within Wisconsin's 8th Senate district, along with the 22nd and 24th Assembly districts.

List of past representatives

References 

Wisconsin State Assembly districts
Milwaukee County, Wisconsin
Ozaukee County, Wisconsin